Shadow To Shine is a solo album from Bing Ji Ling. It was released in March 2011 by Tummy Touch Records. Having co- produced, written, recorded and performed two full-length records, an EP, and  a slew of singles, Bing Ji Ling decided to work with outside producers for the first time. The album was produced by Embassy Sound Productions (Sean Marquand and Daniel Collas of Phenomenal Handclap Band). Shadow To Shine also features other musicians such as Sharon Jones & The Dap-Kings, Scissor Sisters, Antibalas and Phenomenal Handclap Band.

Track listing

Credits

Musicians on all tracks, except where noted:

 Lead vocals: Bing Ji Ling
 Drums: Patrick Wood
 Guitars and Bass: Luke O'Malley
 Keyboard instruments: Daniel Collas
 Congas: Paddy Boom
 Background vocals: Bing Ji Ling, Patrick Wood, Luke O'malley
 Trumpet : Dave Guy
 Tenor and Baritone Saxophone: Leon Michels          
 Tambourine, cowbell, jawbone, ago go: Daniel Collás
 Flute: Rodrigão Ursaia
 Strings: Carolyn Pook and the Chanel Strings
 Horn and string arrangements: Daniel Collás

References
 Thompson, P. (2009, August 13). Pitchfork. Phenomenal Handclap Band. Retrieved November 10, 2011 from http://pitchfork.com/reviews/albums/13376-the-phenomenal-handclap-band/
 The Phenomenal Handclap Band (2011) . Retrieved November 10, 2011, from http://www.friendlyfirerecordings.com/Bands/PHCB/phcb.html
 My Spoonful (2011). Retrieved November 17, 2011, from https://web.archive.org/web/20111206223046/http://myspoonful.com/bing-ji-ling
 BING JI LING AT THE TOP OF THE STANDARD. Retrieved November 17, 2011, http://www.nypress.com/blog-8756-bing-ji-ling-at-the-top-of-the-standard.html
 

2011 albums